The 2008 Missouri gubernatorial election was held on November 4, 2008. Incumbent Republican Governor Matt Blunt decided to retire instead of seeking reelection to a second term in office. Democratic nominee Jay Nixon won the open seat, defeating Republican nominee Kenny Hulshof.

Background 
On January 22, 2008, Governor Blunt unexpectedly announced that he would not seek re-election because he had already "achieved virtually everything I set out to accomplish, and more ... Because I feel we have changed what I wanted to change in the first term, there is not the same sense of mission for a second."

A November 2007 poll conducted by SurveyUSA showed Blunt with a 44% approval rating. His approval among Republicans polled was 68%, and his rating among Democrats was 23%. On November 10, 2007, Democrat Jay Nixon filed the necessary paperwork with the Missouri Ethics Commission to launch a 2008 campaign for governor.

The gubernatorial and other statewide office primaries were held August 5, 2008. CQ Politics rated the race as 'Leans Democratic'.

Timeline 
March 25, 2008 – Filing deadline for Democrats, Republicans and Libertarians
August 5, 2008 – Primary (gubernatorial and other statewide office) elections
August 19, 2008 – Filing deadline for other third parties and Independents
November 4, 2008 – General election.

Primaries

Republican primary

Democratic primary

General election

Predictions

Polling

With Steelman

With Blunt

Results
On election night, Nixon won easily, even though fellow Democrat Barack Obama lost in Missouri in the concurrent presidential election (albeit by only 4,000 votes). Nixon was able to perform well in rural parts of the state. When combined with heavily populated, strong Democratic areas like St. Louis and Kansas City, Hulshof didn't have a chance to come back. Nixon was declared the winner right when the polls closed in Missouri. Hulshof conceded defeat at 9:02 P.M. Central Time.

See also
 2008 United States gubernatorial elections
 2004 Missouri gubernatorial election
 2008 Missouri lieutenant gubernatorial election
 2008 United States presidential election in Missouri

References

External links
Elections from the Missouri Secretary of State
Missouri Governor candidates at Project Vote Smart
Missouri Governor race from OurCampaigns.com
Missouri Governor race from 2008 Race Tracker
Campaign contributions from Follow the Money
Hulshof (R) vs Nixon (D) graph of collected polls from Pollster.com
Official campaign websites (Archived)
Jay Nixon, Democratic candidate
Kenny Hulshof, Republican candidate
Sarah Steelman, Republican candidate
Andy Finkenstadt, Libertarian candidate

Missouri
Gubernatorial
2008